Old Lebanon is an unincorporated community located in the town of Lebanon, Dodge County, Wisconsin, United States. It is home to the world's largest cheese curd.

Notes

Unincorporated communities in Dodge County, Wisconsin
Unincorporated communities in Wisconsin